Spaniocentra is a genus of moths in the family Geometridae described by Prout.

Species
Species include:
Spaniocentra apatella western Philippines, Sulawesi
Spaniocentra apatelloides Holloway, 1996 Borneo
Spaniocentra hollowayi Inoue, 1986
Spaniocentra intermediata Prout Sulawesi
Spaniocentra lobata Holloway, 1982 Borneo
Spaniocentra megaspilaria (Guenée, 1857) Borneo
Spaniocentra pannosa Moore, 1887 Sri Lanka
Spaniocentra undiferata Walker Sulawesi

References

Geometridae